The Swiss Physical Society (SPS) (German: Schweizerische Physikalische Gesellschaft / SPG, French: Société Suisse de Physique / SSP) is a Swiss professional society promoting physics in Switzerland. It was founded in May 1908. SPS is involved in education and mediate young talent programs and Swiss participation in tournaments such as the International Physicists Tournament.  Academic conferences, symposia and workshops are organised by the Swiss Physical Society.

Publications 
In the period 1928 – 1999, the Swiss Physical Society published the Helvetica Physics Acta, which continued as the SPS communications (German: SPG Mitteilungen, French: Communications de la SSP). Since 2008, the SPS communications has three volumes per year. Non peer-reviewed articles on "progress in physics", "historical anecdotes", and "physics and industry" are published. In 2021, a serie of white papers were initiated. The first FOCUS issue discusses technological advances and the impact of nuclear energy.

Honorable Members 
Honorable members of the Swiss Physical Society are:

Past presidents

References

External links

SPS Communications

Physics organizations
Professional associations based in Switzerland